This is a list of seasons played by Walton & Hersham Football Club in English football from the club's formation in 1945 to the present day. It details the club's achievements in major competitions.

Key

Key to league record
 P – games played
 W – games won
 D – games drawn
 L – games lost
 F – goals for
 A – goals against
 Pts – points
 Pos – final position

Key to cup rounds
 DNP – did not participate
 PRE – preliminary round
 QR1 – first qualifying round, etc.
 R1 – first round, etc.
 QF – quarter-finals
 SF – semi-finals

Key to divisions
 CL – Corinthian League
 AL – Athenian League
 ALP – Athenian League Premier Division
 IL – Isthmian League
 ILP – Isthmian League Premier Division
 IL1 – Isthmian League First Division
 IL1s – Isthmian League Division One South
 IL2 – Isthmian League Second Division
 CCFLP – Combined Counties Football League Premier Division

Seasons
The FA Amateur Cup column is incomplete.

Notes

References

English football club seasons
Seasons